Senator Underwood may refer to:

Jim Underwood (politician) (1946–2013), Guam Senate
Joseph R. Underwood (1791–1876), U.S. Senator from Kentucky
Levi Underwood (1821–1902), Vermont State Senate
Nerissa Bretania Underwood (born 1955), Guam Senate
Oscar Underwood (1862–1929), U.S. Senator from Alabama
Thomas R. Underwood (1898–1956),  U.S. Senator from Kentucky
Warner Underwood (1808–1872), Kentucky State Senate